Robin Elizabeth Goad (born January 17, 1970, in Newnan, Georgia), also known as Robin Byrd-Goad, is a retired female Olympic weightlifter from the United States, who competed at the 2000 Summer Olympics. She won the bronze medal in the women's – 53 kg division at the 1998 World Weightlifting Championships in Lahti. Goad competed in the first Women's World Championships in 1987 at age seventeen and was the only female Olympian to compete in the 2000 Olympics who was also present at that first women's Worlds. She currently teaches Physical Education at an elementary school.

Weightlifting achievements
Junior and Senior American record holder in snatch, clean and jerk, and total (1986–1992)
Senior National Champion (1988, 1989, 1991–1996, 1999, & 2001)
Senior American record holder in snatch, clean and jerk, and total (1993–1997)
Senior World Champion (1994)
Pan Am Games Champion (1999)
Olympic Games team member (2000)
Set one Senior World record during career
All-Time Junior and Senior American record holder in snatch and total

References
Profile

External links
Robin Byrd-Goad - Hall of Fame at Weightlifting Exchange

1970 births
Living people
Weightlifters at the 1999 Pan American Games
Weightlifters at the 2000 Summer Olympics
Olympic weightlifters of the United States
People from Newnan, Georgia
American female weightlifters
Sportspeople from the Atlanta metropolitan area
Pan American Games gold medalists for the United States
Pan American Games medalists in weightlifting
World Weightlifting Championships medalists
Medalists at the 1999 Pan American Games
21st-century American women
20th-century American women